The Singleton Argus, also published as The Singleton Argus and Upper Hunter General Advocate, is a semiweekly English language newspaper published in Singleton, New South Wales, Australia since 1874.

History 
The Singleton Argus and Upper Hunter General Advocate began as a weekly newspaper and was first published on 15 July 1874 by John Willis.  In September 1874 it was purchased by Thomas Boyce and Henry Pinchin. The title was shortened to The Singleton Argus on 14 July 1880.

Digitisation 
The paper has been digitised as part of the Australian Newspapers Digitisation Program project of the National Library of Australia.

See also 
 List of newspapers in Australia

References

External links 
 The Singleton Argus  

 
 Press timeline: Select chronology of significant Australian press events to 2011  
 The birth of the newspaper in Australia 
 Isaacs, Victor, Kirkpatrick, Rod and Russell, John (2004). Australian Newspaper History: A Bibliography
 Isaacs, Victor; Kirkpatrick, Rod, Two hundred years of Sydney newspapers: A short history, Rural Press Ltd

Newspapers published in New South Wales
Singleton, New South Wales
Newspapers on Trove